Ramjas International School is a co-educational school located at Sector-4, R.K. Puram, New Delhi, India, affiliated with the Central Board of Secondary Education. It was founded on 14 July 1974 by Rai Kedarnath, who named it after his father, Lala Ramjas Mal. The school is run by the Ramjas Foundation.

Ramjas International School is a three section school with 1900 students, and around 100 teachers.

Subjects and activities 
The primary medium of instruction is English. Other languages taught in the school are Hindi and Sanskrit along with subjects like science, mathematics and social studies. Beyond Class 10, a student can choose either science commerce or humanities stream.

Apart from academics, the school also places importance on co-curricular activities like music, dance, dramatics, arts, photography, taekwondo, yoga and computers. There are hobby clubs where students sharing the same interests can interact. These clubs organize inter-school workshops and symposia annually for students, teachers and parents.

Facilities 
Spread across , the campus has air-conditioned labs, two libraries with internet connections and two computer labs. The classrooms are equipped with smart boards (digital boards). For sports, a gym, basketball and football fields and badminton courts and a ground for playing are available. There is also an art hall and music room.

See also
Education in India
List of schools in India
List of schools in Delhi affiliated with CBSE

References

External links
 School website
 DynamiX the Computer Club
 Central Board of Secondary Education

Schools in Delhi
Educational institutions established in 1974